Sandra Andriamarosoa (born 13 April 1992) is a Malagasy former tennis player.

Born in Antananarivo, she won one ITF doubles title.

Andriamarosoa has been a competitor for the Madagascar Fed Cup team, having made her debut in 2013. She reached a win–loss record of 4–10.

ITF Circuit finals

Doubles: 1 (1–0)

References

External links
 
 
 

1992 births
Living people
Malagasy female tennis players
People from Antananarivo